Noah Christopher Rothman (born 1981) is an American writer, editor, conservative political commentator, podcaster, and author.  He is a senior writer and podcast guest for National Review, and he previously served for several years as associate editor, podcast producer, and online editor for Commentary.

Early life
Rothman was born in 1981 and grew up in Hunterdon County, New Jersey, where he started acting in stage productions when he was 7 years old. Raised in Lebanon Township, New Jersey, he performed in over 30 high school and repertory theater group productions by the time he graduated from Voorhees High School in 2000. He attended Drew University on a performing arts scholarship and earned a Bachelor of Arts degree in Russian Studies in 2004. He earned a Master of Arts degree in Diplomacy and International Relations from Seton Hall University in 2010.

Career

Radio
Rothman joined WABC in New York City in 2002 and became a research analyst and producer for The John Batchelor Show. In 2003, he created and hosted The Freakin' Radio Show on WSNR. He interned for The Opie and Anthony Show on XM Satellite Radio in 2004–2005 and played a regular character on the show.

Web series
Rothman acted in two web series. He played the character Slipknot in an episode of The Scene in 2006. In 2009, he played lead character Zeke Oros in Issues: The Series.

Blogger and editor
Rothman joined Campaigns and Elections magazine in 2010 as an editor. He moved to Ology.com in 2011 as a political news editor, and then on to Mediaite as a writer in 2012. He joined the political blog Hot Air in 2014, replacing Erika Johnsen when she left to pursue a Juris Doctor degree. Rothman left Hot Air to become the assistant online editor of Commentary magazine in 2015.

Author 
He is the author of the 2019 book Unjust: Social Justice and the Unmaking of America. Published by Gateway Editions, an imprint of Regnery Publishing. Reviewer Warren Blumenfeld  saw the book as praising older American social justice movements that challenged hierarchies based on race and gender and attempted to remedy societal inequities associated with prejudices toward certain ethnic groups and the economic displacements of the industrial revolution, while failing to acknowledge the extent to which contemporary America "privileges and subordinates individuals based primarily on their social identities." Jonah Goldberg called Unjust "crisp, insightful and passionate".

Honors 
In 2019, Rothman received the Alexis de Tocqueville Award from The School of Diplomacy and International Relations at Seton Hall University.

Personal life
Rothman married Jaryn Arnold in 2013. They have two children.

Bibliography

 Unjust: Social Justice and the Unmaking of America.  Regnery Gateway (2019).  
 The Rise of the New Puritans: Fighting Back Against Progressives' War on Fun. Broadside Books (2022).

References

External links

Unjust: Social Justice and the Unmaking of America Book interview, Reason podcast

1981 births
Living people
People from Lebanon Township, New Jersey
Male actors from New Jersey
Writers from New Jersey
American columnists
American political commentators
American political writers
American male non-fiction writers
Conservatism in the United States
Voorhees High School alumni
Drew University alumni
Seton Hall University alumni
21st-century American male actors
21st-century American non-fiction writers
21st-century American male writers
Date of birth missing (living people)
Place of birth missing (living people)